The Yakovlev Ya-21, (aka UT-21, No.21 or No.25), was a single-seat high-speed sport aircraft / fighter-trainer designed and built in the Soviet Union in the late 1930s.

Design and development
The Ya-21 was derived from the Yakovlev UT-1, in similar fashion to the Yakovlev AIR-18, by replacing the Shvetsov M-11 radial with an imported  Renault 6Q-01 inverted 6-cylinder in-line engine. The rear cockpit was enclosed with an aft-sliding canopy, a fixed trousered and spatted undercarriage with spring steel tail-skid was fitted, as well as split flaps and a fixed, forward firing, synchronised 7.62mm ShKAS machine gun in the forward fuselage decking. Plans for re-engining the Ya-25 with a Kossov MG-31F 9-cylinder radial engine were cancelled, due to changing priorities of the customer.

The sole Ya-21 was converted into the No.25 prototype by substituting the imported Renault with a  Voronezh MV-6 (Renault Bengali copy). The cockpit also differed in having opaque side panels and no sliding hood, with a deeper windshield to house the gunsight.

Production of both the Ya-21 or No.25 was not implemented due to the Yakovlev OKB focusing on combat aircraft, such as the Yakovlev BB-22 and Yakovlev I-26.

Variants
Ya-21(aka UT-21, No. 21) The sole prototype ( of two intended) fighter-trainer / high-speed sport aircraft powered by a  Renault 6Q-01 engine.
No.25The Ya-21 converted to have open cockpit and powered by a  Voronezh MV-6 engine.

Specifications (Ya-21)

References

1930s Soviet sport aircraft
Ya-21
Single-engined tractor aircraft
Low-wing aircraft
Aircraft first flown in 1937